The Aboriginal Shire of Woorabinda is a local government area in Central Queensland, Australia.

Geography 
Most local government areas are a single contiguous area (possibly including islands). However, Aboriginal Shires are often defined as a number of disjoint areas each containing an Indigenous community. In the case of the Aboriginal Shire of Woorabinda, the distinct regions are: 
 part of the locality of Balcomba (remainder in Central Highlands Region) 
 part of the locality of Bauhinia (remainder in Central Highlands Region) 
 part of the locality of Duaringa (remainder in Central Highlands Region) 
 part of the locality of Wallaroo (remainder in Central Highlands Region) 
 the town and locality of Woorabinda (entirely in the Aboriginal Shire of Woorabinda)

History 
Wadja (also known as Wadjigu, Wadya, Wadjainngo, Mandalgu, and Wadjigun) is an Australian Aboriginal language in Central Queensland. The language region includes  the local government areas of the Aboriginal Shire of Woorabinda and Central Highlands Region, including the Blackdown Tablelands. the Comet River, and the Expedition Range, and the towns of Woorabinda, Springsure and Rolleston.

Amenities 
Woorabinda Shire Council operate an Indigenous Knowledge Centre at Woorabinda.

List of mayors 

 2020–present: Joshua Mark Weazel

References

 
Woorabinda